Halftime shows are a tradition during American football games at all levels of competition. Entertainment during the Super Bowl, the annual championship game of the National Football League (NFL), represents a fundamental link to pop culture, which helps broaden the television audience and nationwide interest.

Prior to the early 1990s, the halftime show featured university marching bands (the Grambling State University Marching Band has performed at the most Super Bowl halftime shows, featuring in six shows including at least one per decade from the 1960s to 1990), drill teams, and other performance ensembles such as Up with People. In the 90s, the halftime show began to feature major hit musicians, beginning with Super Bowl XXV (1991) with New Kids on the Block. In an effort to boost the prominence of the halftime show to increase viewer interest, Super Bowl XXVII (1993) featured a headlining performance by Michael Jackson.

Background 

During most of the Super Bowl's first decade, the halftime show featured a college marching band. The show's second decade featured a more varied show, often featuring drill teams and other performance ensembles; the group Up with People produced and starred in four of the performances. The middle of the third decade, in an effort to counter other networks' efforts to counterprogram the game, saw the introduction of popular music acts such as New Kids on the Block, Gloria Estefan, Michael Jackson, Clint Black, Patti LaBelle, and Tony Bennett. Starting with Super Bowl XXXII, commercial sponsors presented the halftime show; within five years, the tradition of having a theme—begun with Super Bowl III—ended, replaced by major music productions by arena rock bands and other high-profile acts. In the six years immediately following an incident at Super Bowl XXXVIII where Justin Timberlake exposed one of Janet Jackson's breasts in an alleged "wardrobe malfunction", all of the halftime shows consisted of a performance by one artist or group, with the musicians in that era primarily being rock artists from the 1960s, 1970s and 1980s.  These shows were considered "family friendly" and the time in which they took place has been described as "the age of reactionary halftime shows". Since Super Bowl XLV, the halftime show has returned to featuring popular contemporary musicians, with the typical format featuring a single headline artist collaborating with a small number of guest acts.

The NFL does not pay the halftime show performers an appearance fee, though it covers all expenses for the performers and their entourage of band members management, technical crew, security personnel, family, and friends. Super Bowl XXVII halftime show with Michael Jackson provided an exception, as the NFL and Frito-Lay agreed to make a donation and provide commercial time for Jackson's Heal the World Foundation. According to Nielsen SoundScan data, the halftime performers regularly experience significant spikes in weekly album sales and paid digital downloads due to the exposure. For Super Bowl XLIX, it was reported by the Wall Street Journal that league officials asked representatives of potential acts if they would be willing to provide financial compensation to the NFL in exchange for their appearance, in the form of either an up-front fee, or a cut of revenue from concert performances made after the Super Bowl. While these reports were denied by an NFL spokeswoman, the request had, according to the Journal, received a "chilly" response from those involved.

History 
The following is a list of the performers, producers, themes, and sponsors for each Super Bowl game's show. This list does not include national anthem performers, which are listed in the article List of national anthem performers at the Super Bowl. Names in bold are headline performers.

1960s

1970s

1980s

1990s

2000s

2010s

2020s

Details on specific shows

Super Bowl XL 
For the Rolling Stones, the stage was in the form of the group's iconic tongue logo (John Pasche's design first used in 1971 on their Sticky Fingers album). It was the largest stage ever assembled for a Super Bowl halftime show, with 28 separate pieces assembled in five minutes by a 600-member volunteer stage crew. The group performed three songs: "Start Me Up", "Rough Justice", and "(I Can't Get No) Satisfaction". The show was viewed by 89.9 million people, more than the audiences for the Oscars, Grammys and Emmy Awards combined. In the wake of the Super Bowl XXXVIII halftime show controversy with Janet Jackson and Justin Timberlake, ABC and the NFL imposed a five-second delay and censored lyrics considered too sexually explicit in the first two songs by briefly turning off Mick Jagger's microphone—censoring to which the group had previously agreed.
However, the choice of the Rolling Stones sparked controversy in the Detroit community because the band did not represent the traditional Detroit "Motown Sound", and no artists from the area were included.

Records
 The Super Bowl XLIX halftime show starring Katy Perry is the most watched Super Bowl halftime show, with a TV audience of 121 million viewers
 The Super Bowl LIV halftime show starring Shakira and Jennifer Lopez is the most viewed Super Bowl halftime show on YouTube with 270 million Views.
 Based on online metrics, TicketSource revealed that the Super Bowl LIV halftime show starring Shakira and Jennifer Lopez is the "World's most popular" halftime show.

See also 

 List of AFL Grand Final pre-match performances
 List of Grey Cup halftime shows
 List of national anthem performers at the Super Bowl

Notes

References 

Super Bowl halftime shows
Super Bowl halftime shows
Super Bowl halftime shows
Halftime shows